The Old Stone Arch Bridge was a stone arch bridge located along the former route of the National Road in Clark Center, Illinois. The U.S. Army Corps of Engineers built the bridge between 1828 and 1837, the period in which the Corps improved much of the National Road. The National Road was the first major highway built by the U.S. government and brought settlers and goods from the Eastern United States to Illinois. The bridge became part the Illinois state highway system in 1918, and later became part of U.S. Route 40; it served road traffic until 1933, when US 40 was realigned through the area.

The bridge was added to the National Register of Historic Places on November 28, 1978.

See also
Old Stone Arch (Marshall, Illinois), also on National Road and NRHP-listed
 
 
 
 
 List of bridges on the National Register of Historic Places in Illinois
 National Register of Historic Places listings in Clark County, Illinois

References

Road bridges on the National Register of Historic Places in Illinois
Buildings and structures in Clark County, Illinois
National Road
U.S. Route 40
National Register of Historic Places in Clark County, Illinois
Stone arch bridges in the United States